Kléber Laube Pinheiro (born 2 May 1990), known simply as Kléber, is a Brazilian professional footballer who plays for Japanese club Yokohama FC as a forward.

Club career

Brazil
Born in Estância Velha, Rio Grande do Sul, Kléber started his career with Clube Atlético Mineiro, also having finished his development at the Belo Horizonte club. On 21 February 2009, he played his first match for the first team, against Rio Branco Esporte Clube in the Campeonato Mineiro.

Portugal
In the summer of 2009, the 19-year-old Kléber left his country and signed for C.S. Marítimo in Portugal, on loan. He made his Primeira Liga debut on 20 September, featuring ten minutes in a 1–2 away loss against Madeira neighbours C.D. Nacional.

Kléber – who also scored three times in only four matches with the reserves in the third division – finished his first season with Marítimo with eight goals from 20 appearances, notably netting twice in the last round, a 2–1 away win against Vitória S.C. which meant his team leapfrogged their opponents and finished in fifth position, with the subsequent qualification to the UEFA Europa League.

After reported interest from FC Porto, Kléber refused to start 2010–11 with Marítimo, even though he still had another year on his contract. Atlético Mineiro accepted the deal but the Portuguese did not, and he eventually finished the campaign with seven league goals, eight overall.

Kléber finally moved to Porto on 4 July 2011 for a fee of €2.3 million, signing a five-year contract. He scored five goals in five games in the team's pre-season, and three in the first seven competitive fixtures, including the winner in a 2–1 home victory over FC Shakhtar Donetsk in the group stage of the UEFA Champions League.

On 7 February 2013, Kléber returned to his country and signed for Sociedade Esportiva Palmeiras on loan. The move was initially until 30 June, extendable if the side advanced to the semi-finals in the Copa Libertadores.

China
On 14 July 2015, Kléber signed a two-and-a-half-year deal with Chinese Super League club Beijing Guoan FC.

International career
On 10 November 2011, courtesy of his Porto performances, Kléber made his debut for Brazil, appearing in a friendly with Gabon.

References

External links

1990 births
Living people
Brazilian footballers
Association football forwards
Campeonato Brasileiro Série A players
Campeonato Brasileiro Série B players
Clube Atlético Mineiro players
Sociedade Esportiva Palmeiras players
Primeira Liga players
Liga Portugal 2 players
Segunda Divisão players
C.S. Marítimo players
FC Porto players
FC Porto B players
G.D. Estoril Praia players
Chinese Super League players
Beijing Guoan F.C. players
J1 League players
Yokohama FC players
J2 League players
JEF United Chiba players
Brazil international footballers
Brazilian expatriate footballers
Expatriate footballers in Portugal
Expatriate footballers in China
Expatriate footballers in Japan
Brazilian expatriate sportspeople in Portugal
Brazilian expatriate sportspeople in China
Brazilian expatriate sportspeople in Japan